The UConn Huskies women's basketball team is the college basketball program representing the University of Connecticut in Storrs, Connecticut, in NCAA Division I women's basketball competition. They completed a seven-season tenure in the American Athletic Conference in 2019–20, and came back to the Big East Conference for the 2020–21 season.

The UConn Huskies are the most successful women's basketball program in the nation, having won a record 11 NCAA Division I National Championships and a women's record four in a row, from 2013 through 2016, plus over 50 conference regular season and tournament championships. They have taken part in every NCAA tournament since 1989; as of the end of the 2018–19 season, this is the third-longest active streak in Division I. As of 2022, they have also appeared in a record 14 consecutive Final Fours.

UConn owns the two longest winning streaks (men's or women's) in college basketball history. The longest streak, 111 straight wins, started with a win against Creighton University on November 23, 2014, and ended on March 31, 2017 when a buzzer-beater at the end of overtime caused a 66–64 loss in the 2017 NCAA Final Four to Mississippi State. The second streak counts 90 consecutive wins, including two undefeated seasons (2008–09 and 2009–10), and was delimited by two losses against Stanford, the first on April 6, 2008 in the National Semifinals of the NCAA Tournament, and the second – three seasons later – on December 19, 2010. The Huskies also own the longest winning streak in regular-season games in college history; after an overtime loss to Stanford on November 17, 2014, they won their next 126 regular-season games until a 68–57 loss to Baylor on January 3, 2019.

UConn's current head coach is Luigi "Geno" Auriemma, who joined the team in 1985. Coach Auriemma is one of the most successful coaches in college basketball: his 1149–150 record  represents the highest winning percentage among NCAA basketball coaches (minimum 10 seasons), any level, men's or women's, while ranking him second in all-time women's wins behind current Stanford coach Tara VanDerveer.

UConn has also been one of the leaders in women's basketball attendance; the team plays its home games at both the Harry A. Gampel Pavilion in Storrs and the XL Center in Hartford.

History

Early years (1974–1991)
After just one winning season in 10 years under coaches Sandra Hamm (1974–75), Wanda Flora (1975–80) and Jean Balthaser (1980–85), UConn hired as their new head coach Geno Auriemma, who had served as assistant coach at Virginia, with the goal of revitalizing the program. Auriemma's training skills had an immediate impact and the team showed steady signs of progress: after going 12–15 in his first season in 1985–86, Auriemma led UConn to winning seasons in 1986–87 and 1987–88.

Auriemma pulled off one of his biggest and most important early recruiting successes in 1987 when he convinced an All American from New Hampshire, Kerry Bascom, to come to UConn. Bascom had an immediate impact on the UConn program: in 1989 she won the Big East Player of the Year award as a sophomore (she also won the award in her junior and senior years) and led UConn to its first Big East regular season and Tournament title, along with its first-ever NCAA tournament appearance; the tournament ended in a first round loss. With Bascom and teammates Laura Lishness, Megan Pattyson, Wendy Davis and Debbie Baer, UConn reached the NCAA Tournament again in 1990, losing 61–59 to Clemson in the second round after a first-round bye.

In Auriemma's 6th season (1990–91) the program broke through on the national scene, again capturing the Big East regular season and Tournament titles, and earning a #3 seed in the East Regional of the NCAA Tournament, its highest seed up to then. UConn beat Toledo 81–80 at Gampel Pavilion in the opening round game, with Bascom scoring a team NCAA tournament single-game record 39 points, and moved on to the regionals at The Palestra in Auriemma's hometown of Philadelphia. Here the team upset heavily favored ACC power North Carolina State in the Sweet 16, and then defeated Clemson 60–57 to advance to their first-ever Final Four, also a first for any Big East school. UConn's season ended with a 61–55 loss to top-seeded Virginia in the national semifinals at Lakefront Arena in New Orleans.  Bascom was hit with early foul trouble and Virginia held off a late UConn rally. Including these final tournament games, Bascom had set a new UConn scoring record with 2,177 points during her years at the school.

Rebecca Lobo era (1992–1995)

UConn followed up its surprise run to the Final Four in 1991 by landing All-American Rebecca Lobo from Southwick, Massachusetts.

UConn had modest success in Lobo's first 2 seasons, losing early in the NCAA Tournament in both seasons. In 1993–94, UConn had its most successful season to that point; led by Lobo and teammates Jamelle Elliott, Jennifer Rizzotti, Pam Webber, Kara Wolters and Carla Berube, UConn won 30 games for the first time in program history, winning the Big East tournament and regular-season titles.  In the NCAA tournament UConn reached the Elite Eight but came up short in its hopes to make it back to the Final Four, losing to eventual champion North Carolina.

1995 national championship: undefeated (35–0)

With every major player back from 1994, and the addition of Auriemma's most highly ranked recruit to date (Connecticut Player of the Year Nykesha Sales), UConn was in for a season to remember in 1994–95. The season started with an 80-point win over Morgan State; two weeks later, UConn defeated powerhouse North Carolina State by 23 points on the road. This season also saw the birth of one of the greatest rivalries in college sports, the UConn-Tennessee rivalry, that began when the two teams met for the first time on Martin Luther King Day at Gampel Pavilion. UConn defeated Tennessee 77–66 in front of a sold-out crowd in a game televised on ESPN and soon afterwards was ranked No. 1 in the polls for the first time in program history.

UConn went unbeaten through the Conference regular season and Tournament and easily advanced into the NCAA Tournament; in the regional final against Virginia a 4-points win in their closest game of the year opened the doors of the Final Four at the Target Center in Minneapolis. UConn blew out Stanford in the semifinals behind Wolters' 31 points, reaching the championship game for a rematch against Tennessee. In the final game UConn found itself in early trouble when Lobo was called for three personal fouls in 94 seconds in the first half, but in the second half the team was able to rally from a 9-point deficit and a key Rizzotti layup gave UConn the lead with less than 2 minutes to go, a lead that the team kept until the final score of 70–64 and their first national title. Rebecca Lobo was named the Final Four's Most Outstanding Player.

With a perfect 35–0 record, UConn became only the fifth Division I women's basketball team to go undefeated en route to a national championship, and only the second in the NCAA era (since 1982). The Huskies also became the first unbeaten team in NCAA history (all divisions, men or women) to win 35 games in a season.

The 1994–95 UConn team was widely credited with increasing interest in women's basketball. The team was honored with a parade in Hartford, CT that drew over 100,000 spectators. The team won the Team of the Year Award at the ESPN ESPY awards that year, and Lobo became a popular symbol of the sport. UConn also signed a landmark deal during the season with Connecticut Public Television to broadcast their games.

Lobo graduated in 1995 receiving countless accolades: the Naismith College Player of the Year award, the Wade Trophy, the  Associated Press Women's College Basketball Player of the Year award, the USBWA Women's National Player of the Year award, the Honda-Broderick Cup, the Best Female Athlete ESPY Award (first basketball player ever), the Associated Press Athlete of the Year (second basketball player after Sheryl Swoopes), the NCAA Woman of the Year Award, the Academic All-America of the Year and also All-sports Academic All-America of the Year.

In 2010 Lobo became the first Connecticut player inducted into the Women's Basketball Hall of Fame, among a class of six inductees, followed by teammate Jennifer Rizzotti in the class of 2013.

A new powerhouse is born (1996–2000)

After the 1995 Championship title, UConn rose to national prominence as one of the powerhouses in women's college basketball, giving coach Auriemma the chance to recruit star talents from high school like Shea Ralph in 1996 and Svetlana Abrosimova in 1997.

Escalation of rivalry with Tennessee
Starting with their two meetings in 1995, the rivalry between the Tennessee Lady Vols and UConn escalated through the late 1990s and into the 2000s, becoming the marquee matchup in all women's sports, and taking on parallels to the Red Sox-Yankees rivalry in Major League Baseball. Geno Auriemma jokingly once referred to Pat Summitt and Tennessee as the "evil empire", like Red Sox president and CEO Larry Lucchino said of the Yankees.

In the 1995–96 season UConn ended Tennessee's home court winning streak at Thompson–Boling Arena in Knoxville. Tennessee avenged itself in the Final Four that year in Charlotte, defeating UConn 88–83 in overtime; the game is often thought to be one of the more memorable tournament games in tournament history with many back and forth swings of momentum.

UConn defeated Tennessee during the 1996–97 regular season; after a season-ending injury for Shea Ralph in the first round of the NCAA tournament, UConn reached the Regional Final where the two teams met again, with Tennessee prevailing and ending Connecticut's unbeaten season by winning 91–81.

Tennessee defeated Connecticut again in the 1997–98 regular season. A mini controversy erupted in the days after the game when Tennessee's Chamique Holdsclaw was quoted in the papers as saying UConn looked scared during the game; Auriemma denounced that quote. With Shea Ralph and senior Nykesha Sales out for the entire season, freshman Svetlana Abrosimova led a young UConn team to the NCAA Tournament Regional Final where they eventually lost to North Carolina State 60–52.

Nykesha Sales controversy
Auriemma found himself in a national debate following a decision he made during the 1997–98 season. Senior Nykesha Sales suffered a season-ending injury in one of the final games of the regular season. At the time of her injury, she was only one point shy of Kerry Bascom's school scoring record. The next game, with Bascom's blessing, and assistance from friend and Villanova head coach Harry Perretta, Auriemma arranged to have Sales, who was on crutches, score a basket and then allow Villanova to score a basket to start the game at 2–2. Sales then held the school scoring record.

Many people weighed in on the decision on both national and local levels. Auriemma felt guilty that he put Sales through the ordeal and was angry that some columnists chose to fault her and not him. Auriemma was criticized for compromising the integrity of the game, but defended the decision saying it was a school record and he would never had done it without Bascom's blessing.

Arrival of the TASSK Force
Auriemma signed his best recruiting class to date in 1998 when he signed five top-15 nationally ranked players. High school All-Americans Swin Cash, Tamika Williams, Sue Bird, Asjha Jones, and Keirsten Walters were dubbed "TASSK Force" by Connecticut fans, using the players' initials. The class renewed hope of bringing more championships to Storrs after watching archrival Tennessee win three in a row.

The first season for the highly ranked class in 1998–99 was up and down and featured many injuries: Sue Bird tore her ACL and was lost for the season after only 10 games.

In the 1999 meeting at Gampel Pavilion, Tennessee prevailed again. During the game there was a scuffle involving Tennessee's Semeka Randall and Connecticut's Svetlana Abrosimova where Randall threw the ball down, hitting Abrosimova's head. UConn fans booed Randall the rest of the game and Tennessee fans later gave her the nickname "Boo." The 1998–99 season ended in the Sweet Sixteen round of the NCAA Tournament, where UConn lost 64–58 to Iowa State, falling short of reaching the Final Four for the third consecutive time.

2000 national championship

Motivated by the previous disappointing season, UConn came back in 1999–2000 with the clear goal of reaching the championship level again. Led by upperclassmen Shea Ralph, Kelly Schumacher, Svetlana Abrosimova and the TASS Force (the K was dropped when Keirsten Walters had to give up basketball due to knee problems), UConn went through the regular season with a 27–1 record, their only loss being a single-point defeat to Tennessee at home—UConn had beaten Tennessee earlier in the season in Knoxville, and this was the first year the teams met twice. The Huskies advanced to their first Final Four since 1996 and beat Penn State in the semifinals, reaching the Lady Vols for the championship game in Auriemma's hometown of Philadelphia. Despite the two regular season meetings being close battles, UConn used tenacious defense and backdoor cuts to overwhelm Tennessee 71–52 for their second national championship. Connecticut's final season record was 36–1 and Shea Ralph was named the Final Four's MVP.

Diana Taurasi era (2001–2004)

Auriemma pulled off another huge recruiting coup when he convinced All-American guard Diana Taurasi to travel across country to attend Connecticut. Taurasi hailed from Chino, California, and attended Don Lugo High School where she was the recipient of the 2000 Cheryl Miller Award, presented by the Los Angeles Times to the best player in southern California. She was also named the 2000 Naismith and Parade Magazine National High School Player of the Year. Taurasi finished her high school career ranked second to Cheryl Miller in state history with 3,047 points.

With Taurasi joining the core of the 2000 Championship team, Auriemma confidently predicted another championship in 2001, but the season turned out to be more difficult than expected. UConn won the Big East tournament over Notre Dame in a game remembered for the Bird at the Buzzer shot, but lost key players Abrosimova and Ralph to season-ending injuries. As a consequence, Taurasi had to play a much larger role than anticipated in the NCAA Tournament. She led UConn to the Final Four, but in the national semifinals against Notre Dame in St. Louis, Taurasi had a poor shooting game, and despite UConn having attained a 16-point lead at one point, the team lost. Notre Dame went on to win its first national championship.

2002 national championship: undefeated (39–0)

As with the 2000 champions, who had also come off a disappointing loss the year before, UConn returned hungrier than ever in 2001–02. With the TASS force in their senior season and Taurasi emerging as a star in her sophomore year, UConn rolled through its opponents throughout the year. The only close game the Huskies played all year long was a win at Virginia Tech.

UConn advanced to the Final Four and outscored rival Tennessee in the semifinals by 23 points. In front of a record-breaking crowd at the Alamodome in San Antonio, UConn defeated Oklahoma for the championship 82–70 to complete a perfect 39–0 season. The starting five of Bird, Taurasi, Cash, Jones, and Williams is widely regarded as the best starting five in women's college basketball history. The championship game that year shattered ratings for ESPN and at the time was the highest rated college basketball game to air on the network, men's or women's.

2003 national championship

With the TASS force graduated, Diana Taurasi had to carry most of the load in her junior season, with help from returning teammates Maria Conlon, Jessica Moore and Ashley Battle and a top-ranked recruiting class of Ann Strother, Barbara Turner, Willnet Crockett and Nicole Wolff. With no seniors on the roster, 2003 was supposed to be a rebuilding year for UConn, but as the year progressed it became clear that Taurasi was up to the challenge of carrying a group of young players to the championship. UConn finished the regular season undefeated and established a 70-game winning streak, shattering the previous mark of 54 set by Louisiana Tech; the streak ended in the Big East championship game loss to Villanova.

In the NCAA Tournament UConn easily advanced to the Final Four at the Georgia Dome in Atlanta. UConn rallied from a 9-point deficit to beat Texas in the semifinals and, aided by Taurasi's 28 points in the finals, defeated rival Tennessee for UConn's fourth national championship. UConn became the first team to win a championship without a senior on their roster.

2004 national championship

Although the entire team returned and expectations were sky high for a "three-peat" in Taurasi's senior year, UConn had an uneven season. The team gave up large leads against Duke and suffered losses to Notre Dame and Villanova, also losing to Boston College in the semifinals of the Big East tournament.

The Huskies found their rhythm during the NCAA Tournament, in which they were a #2 seed; in the Elite Eight they beat top-seeded Penn State to advance to the Final Four at the New Orleans Arena. After beating Minnesota in the semifinals, UConn again defeated Tennessee for the national championship. The win was even more special as the UConn men's basketball team won the men's national championship the previous night, marking the first time one University won both the men's and women's basketball championships in one season, a feat UConn repeated in 2014.

In her career at UConn, Taurasi led the team to four consecutive Final Fours and three straight national titles. Prior to that final championship, her coach, Geno Auriemma, predicted his team's likelihood of winning with the statement, "We have Diana, and you don't."

Taurasi received many personal accolades at UConn including the 2003 and 2004 Naismith College Player of the Year awards, the 2003 Wade Trophy, the 2003 Associated Press Women's College Basketball Player of the Year award, the 2003 USBWA Women's National Player of the Year award and the 2004 Best Female Athlete ESPY Award. Taurasi was the third basketball player to receive this final honor, after former UConn star Rebecca Lobo and Tennessee star Chamique Holdsclaw. She achieved legendary status among UConn fans, and is widely considered one of the greatest players of all time.

Rebuilding years (2005–2007)
Relative to their high standards, UConn struggled during the first two years following Taurasi's graduation in 2004. Some of its highly touted recruits did not play up to expectations while others suffered injuries. Taken together during the three years 2005–2007, UConn never made a Final Four, something that had become almost routine (17 final fours in 22 years from 1995 to 2016).

The 2004–05 season was marked with sloppy play and ragged offense; UConn lost 8 games and failed to win the Big East regular season crown for the first time since 1993. In the NCAA tournament, UConn lost to Stanford in the Sweet Sixteen.

In the 2005–06 season, UConn showed some signs of improvement, winning the Big East tournament and beating Georgia in the Sweet Sixteen thanks to a fadeaway 3-pointer with 1.8 seconds left by senior Barbara Turner. Behind a home state crowd, UConn almost upset #1 ranked Duke in the regional final, before falling in overtime by 2 points.

In the 2006–07 season, the team improved with the additions of Renee Montgomery, Mel Thomas, Ketia Swanier, and the #1 ranked high school player Tina Charles, helping UConn emerge as a contender again. UConn was a #1 seed in the NCAA tournament, but eventually lost to LSU in the regional final to end the season with a 32–4 record.

Maya Moore era (2008–2011)
After three down years by UConn standards, the team emerged as a heavy contender for the championship in the 2008 season. In addition to all players returning from the 2007 team, #1 ranked high school player Maya Moore joined the team after a bitter recruitment battle between UConn and Tennessee. Shortly after Moore's commitment to UConn, Tennessee announced they were cancelling the annual series with UConn, thus ending one of the biggest rivalries in the sport. Even if both coaches remained vague and unspecific about the reasons of the cancellation, Tennessee filed a complaint to the NCAA about UConn's recruitment of Moore. UConn was found to have committed a secondary violation (involving a tour of the ESPN campus) and no punishment was handed out.

Despite losing Mel Thomas and Kalana Greene to season-ending knee injuries, UConn went through the 2007–08 regular season with only a single loss at Rutgers, by two points, winning both the Big East regular season and tournament titles.  Rallying from a 14-point deficit in the NCAA regional final they beat conference rival Rutgers and advanced to their first Final Four since Taurasi graduated. Those tournament victories were largely credited to senior Charde Houston, a top recruit out of San Diego viewed as not living up to expectations from Geno Auriemma and the UConn fans up to that point, who came up with key rebounds and clutch points in those games. In the National semifinals played at the St. Pete Times Forum in Tampa UConn lost to Stanford, ending its season with a 36–2 record. This would be the team's last loss for quite some time.

2009 national championship: undefeated (39–0)

For the third consecutive year UConn successfully recruited the top ranked high school player in Elena Delle Donne, but shortly before enrolling at UConn Delle Donne requested a release from her scholarship, giving up basketball in order to stay closer to home and play volleyball at the University of Delaware; Delle Donne would eventually play basketball at Delaware, having a great college career that culminated in the #2 pick at 2013 WNBA draft. Despite losing Delle Donne the Huskies were ranked No. 1 in the preseason polls, having returned 10 players from the 2008 Final Four team (including All-Americans Maya Moore, Renee Montgomery and Tina Charles), in addition to Kalana Greene who recovered from her knee injury.

UConn finished the regular season undefeated for the 5th time in school history with a 30–0 record. They won their 17th Big East Regular Season title and their 15th Big East tournament title beating the Louisville Cardinals. The Huskies advanced to their 10th Final Four with an 83–64 victory over Arizona State, and then to the 6th NCAA Championship Game in program history by defeating Stanford, also by the score of 83–64. In the Championship Game UConn defeated Louisville 76–54 behind Charles' 25 points and 19 boards, ending the season with a perfect 39–0 record (with every victory by at least 10 points, a record of its own) and sixth national title.

2010 national championship: undefeated (39–0)

For the second consecutive year (and the sixth time in school history) UConn finished the regular season undefeated, with an average margin of victory of 35.9 points. During the regular season UConn played 11 games against ranked opponents (including 6 in the top ten) with an average margin of victory of 24. They dominated the Big East tournament, winning the championship game 60–32. Throughout the regular season and the Big East tournament, UConn's closest win was against Stanford, by 12 points.

Leading up to the Final Four in San Antonio, UConn dominated teams from Southern, Temple, Iowa State and Florida State. Maya Moore and Tina Charles played little more than half the minutes of every game, with Moore averaging one point per minute played, and the team outscoring its opponents by an average of 47 points. In the Final Four UConn was finally challenged by Baylor and the 6-foot-8 freshman Brittney Griner; Baylor trailed 39–26 at halftime, cut the deficit to 41–38 with 15 minutes remaining in the game,  but UConn finally pulled away for a final score of 70–50.

The national championship game against Stanford was a completely different story. UConn started the game with its worst first half in school history by scoring only 12 points; only 11 teams in tournament history have been held to 12 points or less in the first half: three of them were against UConn teams, and two of them (Southern and Temple) just days earlier in the 2010 Tournament. Stanford itself only managed to score 20 points in the first half. Maya Moore gave UConn the lead (23–22) in the second half with a three-pointer and led the team on a scoring run of 30–6 that eventually secured the national championship with a final score of 53–47. It was the only game in the Huskies' 78-game winning streak that was won by fewer than 10 points. Moore was named the Tournament Most Outstanding Player, to go along with her second straight Wade Trophy award and Academic All-America of the Year award. Charles, who won the John R. Wooden Award and Naismith College Player of the Year awards, was chosen first overall in the WNBA draft days later.

A new record, but no three-peat

The 2010–11 season began with high hopes but much uncertainty for the Huskies. Maya Moore returned for her senior season after a summer with the U.S. National team, but UConn lost major contributors Tina Charles and Kalana Greene who graduated in 2010. Additionally, junior guard Caroline Doty would be out the entire season due to a third knee injury.  In an early test, UConn squeaked by #2 Baylor in their second game of the season. They powered their way through 8 more consecutive wins for their 88th straight victory, beating #10 Ohio State at Madison Square Garden. Their 89th win came at home against #20 Florida State to set the college basketball record for most consecutive wins, previously held by the UCLA men's team.  After a break in the schedule for the holidays, UConn traveled out west and beat the Pacific Tigers to stretch the streak to 90 games. That game, however, was largely a warm-up match for their biggest test of the season, a December 30 matchup at the powerhouse Stanford Cardinal. UConn trailed for the entire game and lost for the first time since their April 6, 2008 Final Four appearance (also against the Cardinal). The loss ended the highly publicized winning streak, as well as their long held spot as the top ranked team in women's basketball which was taken over by Baylor. Connecticut recovered focus after the loss and got through the rest of the regular season undefeated, regaining the #1 ranking along the way after Baylor's loss to Texas Tech in February. They marched through the Big East tournament, including their 3rd victory of the year over Notre Dame in the Big East tournament Championship Game.

In the NCAA tournament Final Four UConn met Notre Dame for the fourth time of the season, with the underdog Fighting Irish prevailing and ending UConn's bid for a third straight national championship. The keys to Notre Dame's success were the stellar performance of sophomore Skylar Diggins and the hot shooting (over 50 percent from the field, a first against UConn in its last 262 games), while UConn had a lack of support for Moore's 36 points. Notre Dame went on to the National Championship Game, but were defeated by the Texas A&M Aggies.

During 2010–11 season Maya Moore posted career highs in scoring (22.3 ppg), assists (4.1 apg) and steals (2.2 spg), sweeping all possible individual honors: she won her 2nd Naismith College Player of the Year award, her 3rd straight Wade Trophy (only player in history - freshmen are not eligible for this award), her 2nd Associated Press Women's College Basketball Player of the Year award, her 2nd USBWA Women's National Player of the Year award and her 2nd John R. Wooden Award; she was also voted Big East Player of The Year (3rd time) and a fourth straight unanimous First-Team All-American in WBCA, USBWA and AP polls (second player ever after Oklahoma's Courtney Paris).

In her amazing college career Maya Moore won 150 games and only lost 4, amassing a total 3036 points (1st Husky ever and 4th all-time in NCAA division I women's basketball), 1276 rebounds (2nd Husky ever), 310 steals (3rd Husky ever), 544 assists (6th Husky ever) and 204 blocks (4th Husky ever); she is the only women's basketball player in Division I history to record 2500 points, 1000 rebounds, 500 assists, 250 steals and 150 blocked shots.  On February 28 she was enshrined in the Huskies of Honor (3rd time ever for an active player).

Maya Moore was also a brilliant college student: she graduated with a 3.7 GPA, earning the Elite 88 Award, and was named Cosida Academic All-America First-Team in 2009, 2010 and 2011, Cosida Academic All-America of the Year in 2010 and 2011 (1st player to ever repeat) and All-sports Academic All-America of the Year in 2011.

After graduation Maya Moore was selected by the Minnesota Lynx as the 1st overall pick in the 2011 WNBA draft (4th time for a Husky), also becoming the first female basketball player signed to the Jordan Brand.

The calm before the storm (2012)
The 2011–12 season would inevitably be a new era after Maya Moore's graduation. Her absence and the loss of 6th-man Lorin Dixon left significant holes to fill in the roster. Geno Auriemma seemed to find the right pieces with a freshman class that included Kaleena Mosqueda-Lewis, Brianna Banks and Kiah Stokes. Mosqueda-Lewis was another State Farm/WBCA High School Player of the Year for UConn, Banks was a highly rated guard, and Stokes, a 6'3 post player, was highly ranked as well. Other key players included sophomores Stefanie Dolson and Bria Hartley, junior Kelly Faris and senior Tiffany Hayes, who would be all selected in the WNBA drafts after graduation.

Even if the Huskies were still a strong national contender, they were no longer viewed as a favorite to win it all. Two key rivals were the usual conference foe Notre Dame and the new rival Baylor, who had the nation's top player in Brittney Griner. In December Griner led #1 ranked Baylor against #2 UConn, scoring 25 points to go along with nine blocks. The 66–61 loss was UConn's first of the season, but not its last. Notre Dame, led by junior star Skylar Diggins, beat the Huskies twice in the regular season, but UConn was able to reverse the roles in the Big East tournament Championship Game; the win was the school's 15th conference title, as well as the 800th career win for coach Geno Auriemma. Ultimately Notre Dame found its revenge with an upset win in the NCAA Tournament Final Four, ending the season with a 3–1 record against the Huskies, a record that would be repeated the following year.

Breanna Stewart era (2013–2016)

2013 national championship

The 2012–13 season began with high hopes having UConn landed three highly ranked recruits: #1 overall Breanna Stewart from Cicero – North Syracuse High School, forward Morgan Tuck and guard Moriah Jefferson. Their play was uneven during the regular season, where UConn went 27–3 with a loss to Baylor and a pair of losses to Notre Dame (including a three-overtime game in South Bend); in the Big East tournament UConn lost a third straight time to Notre Dame that delivered a last-minute comeback. In the NCAA tournament UConn key-players Stewart, Kaleena Mosqueda-Lewis, Stefanie Dolson and senior Kelly Faris raised their level of play, and UConn easily advanced to the Final Four; in the semifinals they handily beat Notre Dame and in the finals they obtained a 93–60 win over Louisville, who had earlier upset Baylor, for a record tying eighth national championship.

The end of 2012–13 season saw the breakup of the Big East Conference. First Pittsburgh, Syracuse and Notre Dame defected to the Atlantic Coast Conference, with Louisville announcing later they would follow in 2014.  Then, the non-FBS football playing members of the Big East (Georgetown, Villanova, Providence, DePaul, Marquette, Seton Hall, St. John's), known colloquially as the "Catholic 7", left to form their own conference, taking the conference name with them. The remaining teams of the former Big East (Connecticut and Cincinnati) joined the new American Athletic Conference (The American or AAC), thus ending the UConn–Notre Dame rivalry in conference tournaments.

2014 national championship: undefeated (40–0)

With Faris and Doty graduated, sophomore Breanna Stewart was the undisputed leader of the 2013–14 UConn team, starting in all 40 games and leading the team with 19.4 points and 2.8 blocks per game; her 291 field goals made was the third-highest single-season total in UConn annals.

The team beat every opponent by at least 10 points and easily reached the NCAA tournament finals, where they met unbeaten Notre Dame, making it the first matchup of two undefeated teams in the championship game. UConn defeated 79–58 Notre Dame (hindered by the loss of one of their stars, Natalie Achonwa, who had torn her ACL in the Elite Eight), to finish the season 40–0, tying Baylor for the most wins in a season and setting the new record for Championship with nine. Breanna Stewart was named the AP Player of the year, only the third time in history a sophomore has won the honor.

2015 national championship

The 2014–15 regular season started with an overtime loss to Stanford in the second game of the season, ending a 47-games winning streak for UConn. Led by juniors Stewart and Jefferson and senior Kaleena Mosqueda-Lewis, UConn quickly recovered winning every other season game, including a 76–58 win against rival Notre Dame. In the National Tournament, both Connecticut and Notre Dame were seeded first in their respective playoff brackets; each advanced to the Final Four held in Tampa, Florida. Connecticut defeated Maryland 81–58, while Notre Dame narrowly beat South Carolina, 66–65, in the semifinals.

The teams met again on April 7, 2015 in the national championship game. UConn won by a score of 63–53 to achieve their third straight national championship and tenth total, with coach Auriemma tying a record set by John Wooden in college basketball.

2016 national championship: undefeated (38–0)

In 2015 UConn landed another top recruit in #1 High School prospect Katie Lou Samuelson; she quickly earned a spot in the starting five alongside sophomore Kia Nurse and seniors Breanna Stewart, Moriah Jefferson and Morgan Tuck. The team was unstoppable all season long, beating every opponent by an average of 39.7 points, and easily winning conference regular season and tournament.
While other #1 seeds Notre Dame, South Carolina and Baylor suffered early upsets in the NCAA Tournament, UConn easily advanced to the Final Four where they defeated Oregon State 80–51 and then old Big East rival Syracuse 82–51 in the Championship Game. UConn completed their sixth undefeated season winning the 11th overall Championship (all-time record for both men's and women's college basketball) and 4th in a row (also a record for women's college basketball). Geno Auriemma is now the only coach in college basketball to have won 11 titles, passing UCLA legend John Wooden (who has 10) and reaching former NBA coach Phil Jackson.

Senior Breanna Stewart was named Final Four Most Outstanding Player for a record 4th straight time; she also performed a back-to-back sweep of all individual honors, winning her 2nd straight Wade Trophy, a record 3rd Associated Press Women's College Basketball Player of the Year award, a record 3rd USBWA Women's National Player of the Year award, a record 3rd Naismith College Player of the Year award and her 2nd straight John R. Wooden Award. Stewart finished with 2,676 points (2nd Husky ever), 1,179 rebounds (4th Husky ever), 426 assists and 414 blocked shots (1st Husky ever), and was a #1 pick in 2016 WNBA draft. Moriah Jefferson finished with a program-record 659 assists and a back-to-back Nancy Lieberman Award as best point guard in the nation. The trio of Stewart-Jefferson-Tuck ended its college career with a 151–5 record, the most victories for college basketball players; they are the only 4-time winners in college basketball history (freshmen were not eligible to play during UCLA men's streak). With their eleventh championship win in 2016, the UConn Huskies have tied the UCLA Bruins men's team for most college basketball championships, and became the first Division I women's basketball team to win four straight national championships.

Current years (2017–)

A new record streak ends

After losing the stellar trio of Stewart, Jefferson and Tuck, many predicted a sub-par season for UConn standards; the AP Poll ranked the team third in the nation, and coach Auriemma had designed a very tough non-conference calendar to test the strength of his young team. The first regular season game, a 2-point win against #12 Florida State, seemed to confirm the expectations, with coach Auriemma predicting "a good beat" ahead.
As the season progressed, however, the team quickly found its rhythm, beating ranked teams like Baylor, Notre Dame and Maryland, and showcasing a talented core of young players. Together with sophomore Katie Lou Samuelson and junior Kia Nurse, the only returning starters, the duo of sophomore Napheesa Collier and junior Gabby Williams quickly rose to national attention; even senior Saniya Chong, who had played few minutes in her first three seasons, showed great improvements, leading the nation in assists-to-turnovers ratio.
Coming from a 75-wins streak from previous season, UConn tied its own previous 90-wins record with a 102–37 win against South Florida on October 1, 2017; the 100th straight wins mark was reached on February 13, 2017  with a 66–55 win against South Carolina.

After easy wins in both conference regular season and conference tournament, UConn entered the NCAA tournament unbeaten, #1 overall and once again a heavy favorite to win it all; the season came to an unexpected end when Mississippi State's Morgan William hit a buzzer-beater to give its team a 66–64 overtime victory in the NCAA Final Four. The loss ended the streak at 111 consecutive wins, an all-time record not only for college basketball games, but also for any team sport played at college level.

Auriemma's 1000th win

The 2017–2018 season was very similar to the previous one. Connecticut returned every key player and added Duke's transfer Azurá Stevens and nation top ranked recruit Megan Walker; the team easily reached the Final Four with a 36–0 record that included solid wins over Stanford, Notre Dame, Louisville and South Carolina. The stage appeared set for a rematch with Mississippi State in the championship game, but historic rival Notre Dame beat UConn in the semifinal with another overtime last second shot by Arike Ogunbowale.

On December 19 a win over Oklahoma gave coach Geno Auriemma his 1000th victory in just 1135 games, making him only the fourth women's coach to reach that plateau — preceded by Pat Summitt, Tara VanDerveer and Sylvia Hatchell — and the fastest one.

2021-2022 First National Title Game in Six Years

In 2022 NCAA tournament, in the Bridgeport Region UConn beat the 15th seed Mercer, 7th seed UCF, 3rd seed Indiana and the 1st seed, Nc State to reach the final four for the 14th consecutive year. They then beat long-time rival and defending national champions Stanford to reach the National Championship game for the first time since 2016. They lost to the number one overall seed South Carolina 64-49.

Season-by-season results

Conference tournament
UConn played in the Big East Conference from the 1982–83 season, the first in which the league sponsored women's basketball and held a tournament, until the conference split in 2013. The Huskies won 18 tournaments in 31 years. From 2013–14 to 2019–20, UConn played in the American Athletic Conference, where they went unbeaten both in regular season and conference tournament games, with a perfect 139–0 record and 7 conference tournaments. In 2020–21, UConn rejoined several of its former conference mates in the current Big East Conference.

Postseason
The Huskies have appeared in the NCAA tournament 34 times, every year since their first appearance in 1989. Their combined record is 126–22 ; they have been to 22 Final Fours and are 11-time National Champions (1995, 2000, 2002, 2003, 2004, 2009, 2010, 2013, 2014, 2015, 2016).

Head coaches

Sandra Hamm (1974–1975)
Sandra Hamm, a Terryville native, was employed part-time as the interim women's coach in the 1974–1975 season, when the team was 2–8. When she wasn't coaching, she taught physical education at a junior high school in Manchester.

Wanda Flora (1975–1980)
After graduating from college in California, Wanda Flora went to graduate school at Indiana University, where she was an assistant coach for the women's basketball team and coached the junior varsity team. After a brief stint at a small college in Pennsylvania, she applied for the job at UConn, starting in 1975 and leading the team to a 38–66 record in five seasons. During her tenure, shooting guard Karen Mullins was the first UConn woman to receive a basketball scholarship; that number had increased to 12 by 1980.

Jean Balthaser (1980–1985)
In 1980 the university hired Jean Balthaser, who had coached at the University of Pittsburgh. Ms. Balthaser continued to expand the program, leading UConn to its first winning season in her first year as coach, and finishing with a 52–88 record over five seasons.

Geno Auriemma (1985–present)
In his 38 years as head coach of the University of Connecticut women's basketball team, the Italian-born Luigi "Geno" Auriemma has inextricably linked his name with that of the team. Inheriting a program that had only had one winning season in its entire history, Auriemma has overseen one of the most successful rebuilding projects in college sports history. Under his watch, UConn has become the winningest team in women's college basketball, and he has made a strong case as one of the best coaches ever. In his astonishing career Auriemma has won more than 25 different national Coach of the Year awards and was inducted into both the Naismith Memorial Basketball Hall of Fame and the Women's Basketball Hall of Fame. He was head coach of the United States women's national basketball team from 2009 until stepping down from that role after the 2016 Summer Olympics. During his tenure with Team USA, they won the 2010 and 2014 World Cups, plus Olympic gold medals in 2012 and 2016.

Notable players

Individual achievements
UConn has featured a great number of star players, All-Americans, Hall of Famers and recipients of individual trophies. The following table shows the UConn players recipients of the major individual awards in women's college basketball.

After the end of the NCAA tournament, the Associated Press selects a Most Outstanding Player.
Seven UConn players received this award since its induction in 1982: Rebecca Lobo (1995), Shea Ralph (2000), Swin Cash (2002), Diana Taurasi (2003 and 2004), Tina Charles (2009), Maya Moore (2010), and Breanna Stewart for a record 4 times (2013, 2014, 2015, 2016).

School records 

Statistics correct through March 18, 2023.

Players expected to be active in 2022–23 are in bold.

Most points (1000-point club)
 Maya Moore (3,036)
 Breanna Stewart (2,676)
 Napheesa Collier (2,401)
 Tina Charles (2,346)
 Katie Lou Samuelson  (2,342)
 Kaleena Mosqueda-Lewis (2,178)
 Nykesha Sales (2,178)
 Kerry Bascom (2,177)
 Diana Taurasi (2,156)
 Kara Wolters (2,141)
 Rebecca Lobo (2,133)
 Bria Hartley (1,994)
 Renee Montgomery (1,990)
 Svetlana Abrosimova (1,865)
 Christyn Williams (1,850)
 Tiffany Hayes (1,801)
 Stefanie Dolson (1,797)
 Ann Strother (1,699)
 Shea Ralph (1,678)
 Kia Nurse (1,674)
 Barbara Turner (1,629)
 Swin Cash (1,583)
 Gabby Williams (1,582)
 Wendy Davis (1,552)
 Jennifer Rizzotti (1,540)
 Cathy Bochain (1,534)
 Moriah Jefferson (1,532)
 Asjha Jones (1,502)
 Crystal Dangerfield (1,480)
 Kalana Greene (1,444)
 Peggy Walsh (1,413)
 Chris Gedney (1,409)
 Tamika Williams (1,402)
 Leigh Curl (1,388)
 Jamelle Elliott (1,387)
 Carla Berube (1,381)
 Sue Bird (1,378)
 Charde Houston (1,365)
 Laura Lishness (1,303)
 Morgan Tuck (1,298)
 Megan Walker (1,251)
 Kris Lamb (1,244)
 Jessica Moore (1,223)
 Aaliyah Edwards (1,186)
 Olivia Nelson-Ododa (1,174)
 Kelly Faris (1,109)
 Megan Pattyson (1,106)
 Mel Thomas (1,098)
 Ashley Battle (1,054)
 Amy Duran (1,000)

Most rebounds (top-15)
 Tina Charles (1,367)
 Maya Moore (1,276)
 Rebecca Lobo (1,268)
 Napheesa Collier (1,219)
 Breanna Stewart (1,179)
 Stefanie Dolson (1,101)
 Jamelle Elliott (1,054)
 Gabby Williams (1,007)
 Peggy Walsh (937)
 Kara Wolters (927)
 Kerry Bascom (915)
 Swin Cash (910)
 Olivia Nelson-Ododa (892)
 Jessica Moore (834)
 Leigh Curl (834)

Most assists (top-15)
 Moriah Jefferson (659)
 Diana Taurasi (648)
 Jennifer Rizzotti (637)
 Renee Montgomery (632)
 Crystal Dangerfield  (599)
 Sue Bird (585)
 Bria Hartley (559)
 Pam Webber (546)
 Maya Moore (544)
 Jill Brumbaugh (541)
 Laura Lishness (531)
 Kelly Faris (525)
 Tiffany Hayes (483)
 Gabby Williams (481)
 Ketia Swanier (479)

Most steals (top-15)
 Nykesha Sales (447)
 Moriah Jefferson (353)
 Jennifer Rizzotti (349)
 Maya Moore (310)
 Gabby Williams (305)
 Svetlana Abrosimova (299)
 Kelly Faris (294)
 Debbie Baer (275)
 Renee Montgomery (266)
 Shea Ralph (252)
 Rita Williams (248)
 Ketia Swanier (247)
 Sue Bird (243)
 Cathy Bochain (240)
 Bria Hartley (235)

Most blocks (top-15)
 Breanna Stewart (414)
 Rebecca Lobo (396)
 Kara Wolters (370)
 Kiah Stokes (325)
 Tina Charles (304)
 Olivia Nelson-Ododa (262)
 Stefanie Dolson (254)
 Napheesa Collier (251)
 Maya Moore (204)
 Kelly Schumacher (181)
 Peggy Walsh (162)
 Asjha Jones (151)
 Diana Taurasi (147)
 Charde Houston (132)
 Swin Cash (130)

Most 3-Point Field Goals Made (top-15)
 Kaleena Mosqueda-Lewis (398)
 Katie Lou Samuelson (382)
 Diana Taurasi (318)
 Maya Moore (311)
 Ann Strother (290)
 Wendy Davis (279)
 Kia Nurse (262)
 Bria Hartley (259)
 Renee Montgomery (254)
 Crystal Dangerfield (241)
 Mel Thomas (224)
 Jennifer Rizzotti (207)
 Sue Bird (207)
 Christyn Williams (189)
 Tiffany Hayes (186)

Huskies of Honor 

The Huskies of Honor is a program recognizing the most significant figures in UConn history, with plaques in Gampel Pavilion commemorating the inductees.

The women's basketball players list includes guards  Sue Bird, Bria Hartley, Moriah Jefferson, Renee Montgomery, Shea Ralph, Jennifer Rizzotti, Nykesha Sales, and  Diana Taurasi; forwards Svetlana Abrosimova, Swin Cash, Napheesa Collier, Maya Moore, Kaleena Mosqueda-Lewis, Katie Lou Samuelson, Breanna Stewart, Morgan Tuck, and Gabby Williams; centers Kerry Bascom, Tina Charles, Stefanie Dolson, Rebecca Lobo, and Kara Wolters.

Retired numbers 
On December 7, 2018, UConn announced that the #50 worn by Rebecca Lobo would be permanently retired, effective with ceremonies to be held during the Huskies' final 2018–19 home game on March 2, 2019. In its announcement, UConn stated that going forward, number retirement would be reserved for former Huskies players inducted into the Naismith Memorial Basketball Hall of Fame, as Lobo was in 2017. At the same time, the Huskies announced that the #34 worn by Ray Allen, a 2018 Naismith Hall inductee, would be retired by UConn men's basketball, with ceremonies held during the season's final men's home game on March 3, 2019. UConn's announcement did not make it clear whether both numbers would be retired across both men's and women's programs, but a university spokesperson clarified that the retirements applied only to the teams that Lobo and Allen competed for, meaning that #50 remains available in men's basketball and #34 in women's. Additionally, on November 14, 2022, UConn retired the #32 worn by Swin Cash, as she was a 2022 Naismith Hall inductee, with ceremonies held during the women's team game against Texas.

WNBA success 
Twenty UConn players have been selected in the first round of WNBA drafts. Five of them have been first overall picks: Sue Bird (2002), Diana Taurasi (2004), Tina Charles (2010), Maya Moore (2011), and Breanna Stewart (2016). Rebecca Lobo was part of the 1997 inaugural draft, with the top players allocated to founding teams without any particular order; similarly Nykesha Sales was part of the 1998 WNBA expansion players allocation.

In the 2002 WNBA draft, the four UConn players tabbed "TASS Force" (Tamika Williams, Asjha Jones, Sue Bird, Swin Cash) were all first round selections, each having immediate impact with their WNBA team.

In the 2016 WNBA draft UConn performed even better, with the three seniors Breanna Stewart, Moriah Jefferson and Morgan Tuck sweeping the first three picks for the first time in the history of any major sport.

Current roster

Trophies and awards

 11 NCAA Tournament Championships (1995, 2000, 2002, 2003, 2004, 2009, 2010, 2013, 2014, 2015, 2016)
 27 Conference tournament Championships: 19 Big East Conference (1989, 1991, 1994, 1995, 1996, 1997, 1998, 1999, 2000, 2001, 2002, 2005, 2006, 2008, 2009, 2010, 2011, 2012, 2021, 2022) and 7 American Athletic Conference (2014, 2015, 2016, 2017, 2018, 2019, 2020)
 28 Conference regular season Championships: 20 Big East Conference (1989, 1990, 1991, 1994, 1995, 1996, 1997, 1998, 1999, 2000, 2001, 2002, 2003, 2004, 2007, 2008, 2009, 2010, 2011, 2021, 2022) and 7 American Athletic Conference (2014, 2015, 2016, 2017, 2018, 2019, 2020)

Team of the Decade 2000–2009

In 2010 Sports Illustrated selected the top 25 sports franchises of the decade 2000–2009. The sports under consideration were the four major professional sports (NFL, MLB, NBA and NHL) along with the three most prominent college sports: football, men's basketball and women's basketball. The Connecticut Huskies were the #3 selection on the list, behind only the professional basketball Lakers and the professional football Patriots, making the Connecticut women's basketball team the highest ranked of the collegiate teams for the three sports under consideration. During this period, UConn won five national titles, while making the Final Four seven of the ten years. Two of the seasons (2001–02 and 2008–09) resulted in perfect 39–0 records.

Records and achievements

Overall
 Most NCAA Championships, any Division, men's or women's (11)
 Most NCAA Division I Final Fours, men's or women's (22)
 Most NCAA Division I tournament #1 seeds, men's or women's (22)
 Most NCAA Division I undefeated seasons, men's or women's (6)
 Most NCAA Division I 30-win seasons, men's or women's (25)
 Most NCAA Division I weeks ranked No. 1 in AP National poll, women's (250)

Streaks
Active streaks in bold
 Most consecutive NCAA Championships, any Division, women's (4, 2013–2016)
 Most consecutive NCAA Division I Final Fours, men's or women's (14, 2008–)
 Most consecutive NCAA Division I Elite Eights, men's or women's (16, 2006–)
 Most consecutive NCAA Division I Sweet Sixteen, men's or women's (28, 1994–)
 Most consecutive NCAA Division I tournament wins, women's (28, 2013–2017)
 Most consecutive NCAA wins, any Division, men's or women's (111, 2014–2017)
 Most consecutive NCAA Division I regular-season wins, men's or women's (126, 2014–2019)
 Most consecutive NCAA Division I home court wins, women's (99, 2007–2012)
 Most consecutive NCAA Division I road wins, men's or women's (62, 2014–2019)
 Most consecutive NCAA Division I 30-win seasons, men's or women's (14, 2006–2019)

See also
 List of teams with the most victories in NCAA Division I women's college basketball
 Huskies of Honor
 List of UConn Huskies in the WNBA draft
UConn Huskies women's basketball statistical leaders

References

External links